George Jean Nathan (February 14, 1882 – April 8, 1958) was an American drama critic and magazine editor. He worked closely with H. L. Mencken, bringing the literary magazine The Smart Set to prominence as an editor, and co-founding and editing The American Mercury and The American Spectator.

Early life
Nathan was born in Fort Wayne, Indiana, the son of Ella (Nirdlinger) and Charles Naret Nathan. He graduated from Cornell University in 1904. There, he was a member of the Quill and Dagger society and an editor of the Cornell Daily Sun.  There is some evidence that Nathan was Jewish and sought (successfully) to conceal it.

Relationships and marriage
Nathan had a reputation as a ladies' man and was not averse to dating women working in the theater. The character of Addison De Witt, the waspish theater critic who squires a starlet (played by a then-unknown Marilyn Monroe) in the 1950 film All About Eve was based on Nathan. He had a romantic relationship with actress Lillian Gish, beginning in the late 1920s and lasting almost a decade. Gish repeatedly refused his proposals of marriage.

Nathan eventually married a considerably younger stage actress, Julie Haydon, in 1955.

Death
Nathan died in New York City in 1958, aged 76.

Legacy
He wrote only one play, the one-act titled The Eternal Mystery, which premiered in 1913 at the Princess Theatre in New York. Owen Hatteras referenced the play as a failure when he quipped that Nathan "has forbidden the production of the play henceforth in any American city save Chicago, in which city anyone who chooses may perform it without payment of royalties." 

The George Jean Nathan Award, an honor in dramatic criticism, is named after him. Nathan was also inducted into the American Theater Hall of Fame.

Papers 
Nathan bequeathed his letters and papers to Cornell University. Among his papers were several letters he received from Eugene O'Neill.

Secondary Sources 

 Isaac Goldberg: George Jean Nathan: A Critical Study (Girard, Kansas, Haldeman-Julius Company [c1925]).
 Seymour Rudin: George Jean Nathan: A Study of His Criticism ([Ithaca, N.Y.] 1953).
 Thomas F. Connolly: George Jean Nathan and the Making of Modern American Drama Criticism (Madison: Faileigh Dickinson University Press, c2000).

References

External links

 
 
 George Jean Nathan Award at Cornell
 
 
 

1882 births
1958 deaths
American magazine editors
American theater critics
Burials at Gate of Heaven Cemetery (Hawthorne, New York)
Cornell University alumni
Writers from Fort Wayne, Indiana
Progressive Era in the United States
Jewish American writers